The 1992 Asian Badminton Championships was the 11th edition of the Badminton Asia Championships. It was held in Cheras Indoor Stadium, Kuala Lumpur, Malaysia, from April 7 to April 11. Men's singles and Men's doubles disciplines were won by Malaysia; Women's singles and Women's doubles by China and Indonesia won the Mixed doubles event.

Medalists

Medal table

Final Results

Men's singles

Women's singles

Men's doubles

Women's doubles

Mixed doubles

See also
 Medalists at the Badminton Asia Championships

References 

Badminton Asia Championships
Asian Badminton Championships
1992 Badminton Asia Championships
Badminton Asia Championships
Badminton Asia Championships